Mason Cook Darling (May 18, 1801March 12, 1866) was an American medical doctor, politician, and Wisconsin pioneer.  He was a member of Wisconsin's first delegation to the United States House of Representatives after statehood (1848-1849), and was the first Mayor of Fond du Lac, Wisconsin.

Background 
Born in Amherst, Massachusetts, Darling attended the public schools. He taught school in the State of New York. He studied medicine. He was graduated from the Berkshire Medical College in 1824 and practiced medicine for thirteen years. He moved to Wisconsin Territory in 1837 and was one of the original settlers at Fond du Lac in 1838.

Public office 
Mason served in the Massachusetts House of Representatives from the town of Greenwich in Hampshire County, Massachusetts in 1834 prior to moving to Wisconsin Territory. He served as member of the Territorial legislative assembly 1840–1846, and as member of the Territorial Council in 1847 and 1848. Upon the admission of Wisconsin as a State into the Union, Darling was elected as a Democrat to the Thirtieth Congress. He represented Wisconsin's newly created 2nd congressional district and served from June 9, 1848, to March 3, 1849. He was not a candidate for renomination in 1848 to the Thirty-first Congress, and was succeeded by Orasmus Cole, a Whig. He was elected the first mayor of Fond du Lac in 1852.

Private life 
In 1848, his daughter Helen married John A. Eastman. Darling founded Fond du Lac Lodge 26 Freemasons in 1849, and served as its First Master. He resumed the practice of medicine and was a dealer in real estate at Fond du Lac until 1864, when he moved to Chicago, at the same time as the Eastmans.

He died in Chicago on March 12, 1866, and was interred in Rienzi Cemetery, Fond du Lac.

Electoral history

United States House of Representatives (1848)

| colspan="6" style="text-align:center;background-color: #e9e9e9;"| Special Election, May 8, 1848

References

External links
 
 

|-

|-

1801 births
1866 deaths
Politicians from Amherst, Massachusetts
Democratic Party members of the United States House of Representatives from Wisconsin
Members of the Massachusetts House of Representatives
Members of the Wisconsin Territorial Legislature
Mayors of places in Wisconsin
Politicians from Fond du Lac, Wisconsin
Physicians from Wisconsin
Physicians from Massachusetts
American Freemasons
Berkshire Medical College alumni
19th-century American politicians